Club Deportivo La Victoria (sometimes referred as La Victoria) is a Peruvian football club, playing in the city of Abancay, Apurímac, Peru.

History
The Club Deportivo La Victoria was founded on August 18, 1972 and participated in the 1992 Torneo Zonal.

In 2014 Copa Perú, the club classified to the Departamental Stage, but was eliminated by Miguel Grau and DECH in the Cuadrangular Final.

In 2016 Copa Perú, the club classified to the National Stage, but was eliminated when it finished in the 39th place.

Honours

Regional
Liga Departamental de Apurímac:
Winners (2): 1990, 2022
Runner-up (1): 2016

Liga Provincial de Abancay:
Winners (1): 1990
Runner-up (3): 2014, 2016, 2022

Liga Distrital de Abacany:
Winners (2): 1990, 2016
Runner-up (3): 2012, 2014, 2022

See also
List of football clubs in Peru
Peruvian football league system

References

External links

Football clubs in Peru
Association football clubs established in 1972
1972 establishments in Peru